This list of terms about pen and ink is an alphabetic list of terminology about ink pens and ink. Some of the terms might not be very notable outside this list.

A 
 Alizarine ink

B 
 Ballpoint pen – an ink pen which uses a roller ball tip
 Ballpoint pen artwork 
 Bic Cristal – a brand of inexpensive, disposable ink pen
 Birmingham pen trade – commerce of ink pens in Birmingham, England
 Birmingham Pen Trade Heritage Association 
 Biro – a type of ink pen, also known as a ballpoint pen
 Blacklight paint – a type of ink which glows under a black light

C 
 C. Howard Hunt – an American company that manufactured dip pens; defunct; its pens are now commercialized under the "Speedball" brand
 Classmate Stationery – an Indian brand of student stationery products
 Compatible ink - for use in printers
 Conductive ink -  results in a printed object which conducts electricity

D 
 D. Leonardt & Co. – a manufacturer of pens; founded in 1856, it is one of the oldest manufacturers of dip pens
 Demonstrator pen – a pen which is transparent, so its inner mechanism can be seen
 Dip pen – a type of nib pen with no ink reservoir
 Drop out ink

E 
 Election ink – a type of ink applied to the finger of a voter, to prevent election fraud
 Erasermate – a brand of erasable pen, manufactured by Papermate
 Erythrosine – a type of ink and food dye
 Esterbrook – a brand of ink and fountain pens

F 
 Flex nibs – pen nibs which use pressure to vary line width
 Flo-Master – a brand of inks and markers in the latter half of the 20th century
 Fountain pen – a nib pen which contains a reservoir of ink
 Fountain pen inks

G 
 Gel pen – any pen using a water-based liquid or gelled ink

I 
 India ink – a type of ink
 Ink – a substance used to stain or dye
 Ink blotter – a pad used to absorb excess ink
 Inkpot – a low-lying bottle used to hold ink
 Inkwell – a low-lying bottle used to hold ink
 Iron gall ink – a purple-black or brown-black ink made from iron salts and tannic acids

J 
 Joseph Gillott's – a manufacturer of ink pens
 Jotter – a type of ballpoint pen

L 
 Lithol Rubine BK – a type of ink and food dye

M 
 Marker pen – an ink pen used to make wider marks
 Montblanc  – manufacturer of ink pens
 Mr. Sketch – a brand of scented marker pens

N 
 Nib – the part of a pen which contacts a surface to deposit ink

 Nibmeister – a person who repairs fountain pens or grinds nibs

P 
 Paint marker – a type of pen using oil-based paint
 Parker – a manufacturer of luxury pens
 Pelikan - a German,  Swiss-incorporated manufacturer of fountain pens and other writing, office and art equipment
 Pen – an instrument for writing
 Pen Room – a museum in Birmingham, England about the pen trade
 PenAgain – a pen used to reduce repetitive strain injury
 Permanent marker 
 Perry & Co. – a manufacturer of ink pens
 Plastisol – a type of ink
 Porous point pen – pen with a point of porous material such as felt or ceramic

Q 
 Quill – an ink pen made from a bird feather
 Quink – a fountain pen ink developed by the Parker Pen Company

R 
 Rastrum – a five-pointed instrument used to draw parallel lines, sometimes assembled out of ink pens
 Retipping – replacing or restoring the tip of an ink pen
 Rollerball pen – pen using water-based gelled ink (rather than oil)
 Ruling pen – a pen used to denote ruler lines

S 
 Sheaffer - a manufacturer of writing implements, primarily luxury pens, founded in 1913
 Sheaffer Prelude – a line of writing instruments made by the Sheaffer Pen Company
 Skin pens – a type of pen applied to skin by doctors or tattoo artists, to create a temporary image
 Solid ink – a type of ink for use in printers
 Soy ink – made from soybeans and more environmentally friendly than some other inks
 Space Pen – a pen which uses pressurized ink cartridges and is able to write in zero gravity
 Speedball – a manufacturer of pens and other art materials
 Stark's ink – a homemade ink in the 19th century

T 
 Tattoo – a nearly permanent pattern drawn on skin
 Technical pen – a pen used to make consistent lines in architectural or technical drawings
 Thermochromism – a process of coloring by using heat

U 
 uni-ball – a brand of ink pen made by the Mitsubishi Pencil Company
 UV marker – a pen whose marks can be seen only under an ultraviolet light

W 
 Walnut ink – a type of ink made from walnuts' husks

See also 
 List of pen types, brands and companies
 List of stationery topics

Inks
Pens